Tall-e Bidkan (also Romanized as Tall-e Bīdkān; also known as Bīdkān-e Khān Neshīn) is a village in Jereh Rural District, Jereh and Baladeh District, Kazerun County, Fars Province, Iran. At the 2006 census, its population was 83, in 15 families.

References 

Populated places in Kazerun County